Kysre Rae Gondrezick (born July 27, 1997) is an American professional basketball player who is currently a free agent. She previously played for the WNBA's Indiana Fever and Chicago Sky.

Gondrezick attended Benton Harbor High School in Michigan. She was named 2016 Michigan Miss Basketball and Michigan Gatorade POY playing for Benton Harbor High School with her mom serving as an assistant coach. Gondrezick averaged 40.5 points per game as senior and graduated as No. 2 scorer in Michigan girls history (2,827). She played college basketball at the University of Michigan and West Virginia University.

Michigan and West Virginia statistics

Source

WNBA career
Gondrezick was the 4th pick in the 2021 WNBA draft by the Indiana Fever.

As of January 18th, 2022, Gondrezick was waived by the Indiana Fever as announced on their Twitter account.

After joining the Chicago Sky for the team's 2022 training camp, Gondrezick was waived on May 4th and did not make the final roster for opening night.

WNBA career statistics

Regular season

|-
| align="left" | 2021
| align="left" | Indiana
| 19 || 0 || 9.1 || .283 || .286 || .500 || 1.0 || 0.9 || 0.4 || 0.0 || 0.9 || 1.9
|-
| align="left" | Career
| align="left" | 1 years, 1 team
| 19 || 0 || 9.1 || .283 || .286 || .500 || 1.0 || 0.9 || 0.4 || 0.0 || 0.9 || 1.9

Endorsements
In April 2021, it was announced that Gondrezick and Adidas entered into a multiyear endorsement agreement.

Personal life
Gondrezick is the daughter of the late former NBA player Grant Gondrezick and Lisa Harvey. Her father Grant played college basketball at Pepperdine, her mother Lisa won a National title at Louisiana Tech, and her sister played for Michigan State Spartans women's basketball.

References

1997 births
Living people
American women's basketball players
Basketball players from Michigan
Indiana Fever draft picks
Indiana Fever players
Michigan Wolverines women's basketball players
People from Benton Harbor, Michigan
Point guards
West Virginia Mountaineers women's basketball players